Events from the year 1808 in Scotland.

Incumbents

Law officers 
 Lord Advocate – Archibald Colquhoun
 Solicitor General for Scotland – David Boyle

Judiciary 
 Lord President of the Court of Session – Lord Succoth to 31 August; then Lord Avontoun
 Lord Justice General – The Duke of Montrose
 Lord Justice Clerk – Lord Granton

Events 
 January – Christopher Anderson begins missionary work in The Pleasance district of Edinburgh, which will lead to his taking over the Charlotte Chapel.
 2 March – inaugural meeting of the Wernerian Natural History Society is held in Edinburgh under the presidency of Prof. Robert Jameson.
 21 May – Thomas Telford's Tongland bridge is fully completed.
 27 May – the Kilmarnock and Troon Railway becomes the first railway line in Scotland to be authorised by Act of Parliament.
 7 June – first meeting at the Bogside Racecourse, Irvine.
 October – Thomas Telford's Dunkeld-Birnam bridge is opened to road traffic.
 John Rennie's new Musselburgh Bridge (over the Esk) is completed.
 Court of Session Act reforms the Court of Session.
 Broadford flax mill is established in Aberdeen, the earliest iron-framed textile mill in Scotland.
 William Blackwood begins publication of the Edinburgh Encyclopædia, edited by David Brewster.
 Travel writer Sir John Carr publishes Caledonian Sketches, or a Tour through Scotland in 1807.

Births 
 22 January – James Fergusson, architectural historian (died 1886 in London)
 29 February – Hugh Falconer, geologist, botanist, paleontologist and paleoanthropologist (died 1865 in London)
 9 May – John Scott Russell, shipbuilder (died 1882 on the Isle of Wight)
 11 June – James Ballantine, painter (died 1877)
 16 June – James Frederick Ferrier, metaphysical and epistemological philosopher (died 1864)
 19 August – James Nasmyth, mechanical engineer (died 1890 in England)
 24 August – William Lindsay Alexander, church leader (died 1884)
 c. 7 or 8 September – William Livingston (Uilleam Macdhunleibhe), Gaelic poet (died 1870)
 15 September – John Hutton Balfour, botanist (died 1884)
 21 September – Evan MacColl, poet writing in Gaelic and English (died 1898 in Canada)
 19 December – Horatius Bonar, Free Church minister and hymnodist (died 1889)
 James Gall, evangelical minister, astronomer and cartographer (died 1895)
 David Moore, born Muir, botanist (died 1879 in Ireland)
 David Rhind, architect (died 1883)
 James Aitken Wylie, Free Church minister and religious historian (died 1890)

Deaths 
 20 January – Francis Charteris, Lord Elcho (born 1749)
 28 January – James Finlayson, minister of the Church of Scotland (born 1758)
 13 February – William Fullarton, British Army officer, agriculturalist and colonial governor (born 1754; died in London)
 19 June – Alexander Dalrymple, hydrographer (born 1737)
 2 July – Robert Arnot, Moderator of the General Assembly of the Church of Scotland (born 1744)
 21 August – John Adamson, Moderator of the General Assembly of the Church of Scotland (born 1742)
 23 August – Robert Small, Moderator of the General Assembly of the Church of Scotland, mathematician and astronomer (born 1732)
 5 September – John Home, Episcopalian minister, playwright and writer (born 1722)
 20 September – John Elliot, Royal Navy officer (born 1732)
 15 October – James Anderson of Hermiston, agriculturalist (born 1739)
 24 October – Francis Wemyss-Charteris, landowner (born 1723)

The arts
Walter Scott's poem Marmion: a tale of Flodden Field is published in Edinburgh.

See also 
 1808 in the United Kingdom

References 

 
Years of the 19th century in Scotland
1800s in Scotland